Scotty "Scott" Cummings (born 3 October 1970) is a former Canadian professional darts player, who played in the Professional Darts Corporation (PDC) events.

Career
Cummings played in three PDC World Darts Championships between 1999 and 2001, although he never won a game.

Cummings played in the 1999 World Matchplay, losing in the Last 32 to Colin Lloyd of England 8–10.

World Championship performances

PDC

 1999: Last 32: (lost to Shayne Burgess 0–3) (sets)
 2000: Last 32: (lost to Steve Raw 2–3)
 2001: Last 32: (lost to Cliff Lazarenko 0–3)

References

External links
 (incorrectly named as Steve Cummings)

1970 births
Living people
Canadian darts players
Professional Darts Corporation associate players
Sportspeople from Hamilton, Ontario